Spawn of the North is a 1938 American adventure film about rival fishermen in Alaska starring George Raft and featuring Henry Fonda, Dorothy Lamour, Akim Tamiroff and John Barrymore. The picture was directed by Henry Hathaway and was an unofficial follow up to Souls at Sea, also featuring Raft and directed by Hathaway. Spawn Of The North is a reworking of The Virginian, transferred to Alaska and with  emphasis shifted to the Steve character.

Plot

Jim Kimmerlee owns a salmon cannery. He is pleased to see old friend Tyler Dawson, who has been away hunting seal. Also glad to see Tyler is his sweetheart, hotel owner Nicky Duval.

Thieves have been stealing from fishing traps. Jim is determined to put a stop to it, engaging in a feud with Red Skain, a Russian fisherman who is suspected in the thefts.

Di Turlon comes back to town after several years of big-city life. The adjustment to the fishing community is awkward at first, but Di comes around and becomes interested romantically in Jim.

As he and others go after Red and the thieves, Jim is dismayed to learn that Tyler has become one of Red's accomplices. Planning to catch the fish poachers in the act, Jim tries to spare Tyler by having Nicky sabotage his boat, but Tyler finds another vessel and joins Red at sea. Jim exchanges gunfire with the thieves, killing two and wounding Tyler.

After being found and helped by his friend after Red has abandoned him, Tyler decides there is one more thing he must do. Close to death, he takes a boat back out, confronts Red, then blows a loud boat whistle that causes an avalanche, resulting in both men's death. Jim speaks admiringly of his friend's sacrificial act.

Cast
George Raft as Tyler Dawson
Henry Fonda as Jim Kimmerlee
Dorothy Lamour as Nicky Duval
Akim Tamiroff as Red Skain
John Barrymore as Windy Turlon
Louise Platt as "Di" Turlon
Lynne Overman as "Jack" Jackson
Fuzzy Knight as Lefty Jones
Vladimir Sokoloff as Dimitri 
Duncan Renaldo as Ivan
John Wray as Dr. Sparks
Michio Ito as Indian Dancer
Stanley Andrews as Partridge
Richard Ung as Tom

Reception
The film was a big box office success and was later remade as Alaska Seas (1954).

The special effects and production team who worked on Spawn of the North received an Academy Honorary Award at the 11th Academy Awards for their efforts. The award was given to the special effects artist Gordon Jennings, with assistance from Jan Domela, Dev Jennings, Irmin Roberts and Art Smith; the transparencies artist Farciot Edouart, with assistance from Loyal Griggs and the sound effects artist Loren L. Ryder, with assistance from Harry D. Mills, Louis Mesenkop and Walter Oberst.

References

External links

1938 films
1938 adventure films
American adventure films
American black-and-white films
1930s English-language films
Films scored by Dimitri Tiomkin
Films about fishing
Films directed by Henry Hathaway
Films set in Alaska
Paramount Pictures films
Films with screenplays by Jules Furthman
Films that won the Best Visual Effects Academy Award
1930s American films